On Overgrown Paths is the English title of the final novel by  Norwegian author and nobel laureate Knut Hamsun. Hamsun's attempt to prove his soundness of mind after his sanity was called into question.  Written at the age of 90, as his last literary work, the short novel is part a fiction pamphlet, part diary, part old man's apologia and part protest at the court ruling in his 1948 trial, that determined he had "permanently impaired mental abilities".

"St. John's Day, 1948 - Today, the Supreme Court has given its verdict and I end my writing."

- So ends Knut Hamsun's last book and last literary sentence.
Written while in police custody after WWII for his outspoken National Socialist sympathies and support of the Quisling government during the German occupation of Norway, 1940-45.

Highly controversial in its day, the narrative structure is of small separate events without obvious links, but differs from his fiction writing only in its claim to be historically and autobiographically true. Later critics point out that fiction-reality boundaries elide in several of his books and 'OOP' presents some fictional elements as reality.
Voted Best Norwegian Non-Fiction Book published after 1945 in the Culture and Entertainment category in the NRK program Faktasjekken, by  Members of the Norwegian Professional Literary Authors and Translators Association.

The original Norwegian title was Paa gjengrodde Stier.

English editions
Translated by Carl L. Anderson published by Paul S. Eriksson Inc., N.Y. (1967); MacGibbon & Kee, London & Aylesbury (1968).
Translated by Sverre Lyngstad published by Green Integer, Series No.22 (1999); .

Other languages
The novel has been published in German, Italian, Spanish, Icelandic, Hungarian, Serbian (translated by Mirko Rumac; Beograd: LOM, 2011), Bosnian, French, Estonian and Ukrainian. The Bosnian translation was done by Munim Delalic, and it was published by Dobra knjiga d.o.o., Sarajevo, in 2014.

Film adaptation
The writing of this book is shown, in part, in the film Hamsun (1996), directed by Jan Troell. In the film, Hamsun is portrayed by Swedish actor Max von Sydow.

References

1949 novels
Novels by Knut Hamsun